The Savoia-Marchetti S.63 was a single hull development of the Italian Savoia-Marchetti S.55 flying boat. It first flew as a bomber in 1927 but was rapidly converted into an airliner. The only S.63 built served with an Italian airline.

Design and development

Savoia-Marchetti's earlier and very successful S.55 flying boat had been designed as a torpedo bomber, leading to the use of a twin hull. It could carry passengers and make long distance flights but its hulls added drag and weight, making take-offs with large fuel loads challenging. The S.63 differed primarily in having a single hull and was originally built as a bomber. However, after service trials in 1927 it was decided that it did not offer any great advantage over the S.55, so it was converted into a ten-passenger airliner.

The outer panels were trapezoidal in plan and set with about 6° of dihedral. They carried short, overhung, tapered ailerons near the tips. The wing was a wooden structure, with three spars. Its leading edge was covered with plywood, the rest with fabric.

The S.63 was powered by a push-pull pair of  water-cooled  Isotta Fraschini Asso 500 V-12 engines. These were mounted high above the wing centre on inward-leaning pairs of N-struts and a pair of central transverse V-struts, canted strongly upwards and uncowled to reduce fire risk. They shared a single, forward-mounted honeycomb radiator and an oil tank positioned between them.

The earlier S.55 carried its empennage on a pair of open, flat, triangular girders constructed from tubes, one from each hull. The S.63 used a similar arrangement, allowing its single, unusually wide hull to be short. Its bottom had a shallow, concave V-section and a single step. Lateral stability on the water was provided by outward-leaning, V-bottomed floats mounted a little outside the centre-section. The original bomber version had defensive ring-mounted machine gun positions in the nose and behind the trailing edge.  A forward entrance led to the pilots' side-by-side  open cockpit, offset to the left and ahead of the wing leading edge. The airliner conversion separated the pilots into two symmetrically positioned, enclosed cockpits and introduced a windowed  passenger cabin behind the cockpit which seated ten. Behind it there was a space for luggage and a wireless operator's compartment with access to the engines.

The empennages of the S.55 and S.63 were similar, though the latter had two vertical tails rather than three. These were wire-braced and, including balanced rudders, quadrantal in profile, with one attached to each girder. A rectangular tailplane, mounted at a high incidence, linked the girders and projected beyond them.  It carried a semi-elliptical, balanced elevator.

Operational history

The first flight of the S.63 was on 8 September 1927. By March 1928 Alandresso Passaleva had completed sufficient testing to report excellent characteristics. Registered as I-AABH, it was bought by Società Aerea Mediterranea (SAM) airline and used on the Rome-Cagliari route along with their S.55s.

Operators
Italy
Società Aerea Mediterranea

Specifications

References

Flying boats
Twin-engined push-pull aircraft
1920s Italian airliners
Savoia-Marchetti aircraft